National Highway 135BD, commonly referred to as NH 135BD is a national highway in India. It is a spur road of National Highway 35.  NH-135BD traverses the state of Madhya Pradesh in India.

Route 
NH135BD connects Sirmaur, Kolha, Rajgarh, Kyoti, Bagahaiya, Lalgaon, Pangadi, bans and Kalwari.

Junctions  

  Terminal near Sirmaur.
  Terminal near Jamira.

See also 
 List of National Highways in India
 List of National Highways in India by state

References

External links 

 NH 135BD on OpenStreetMap

National highways in India
National Highways in Madhya Pradesh